Just Tricking! is the first volume in the Just! series written by Andy Griffiths.  Around the world, the book was released with different titles: Just Kidding! for the United Kingdom and Just Joking! for North America.

Stories

Playing Dead 
Andy tries to get out of school for the day by lying in bed all day with his eyes open, not intending to blink or breathe when anyone is looking. Surprisingly, his parents seem to actually believe that he's dead, so Andy's father digs a grave near the family's lemon tree outside and places Andy in, after which his father reads, "Ashes to ashes, dust to dust." Soon after realizing this "burial" was to teach Andy a lesson all along, he decides to abort the joke, rising from his "grave" and (apparently) scaring the living daylights out of his parents, who soon begin to burst into hysterics and declare, "Just tricking!", his parents back tricked him, Afterwards, Andy finally gets what he wants: the day off school, (although it wasn’t what he expected).

Cockroach 
Andy and his parents head to the home of Andy's father's boss, Mr. Bainbridge, for a salad dinner, with Andy under strict orders not to play any jokes. When Andy discovers a cockroach in Bainbridge's salad bowl, he wants to tell the Bainbridges about it, but he fears it will look like a joke. Andy tries to get rid of the roach himself, but in a hilarious climax, Andy ends up naked, his head wet with toilet water and discovered stuck in the Bainbridge's bathroom window after numerous attempts to get rid of the roach, hoping that "he'll be able to interest anyone for media rights to story and whether the proceeds will make up for the pocket-money he's about to lose."

Gorillagram 
In this story, Andy gets a big gorilla suit and heads to the fictional La Trattoria for his sister's sixteenth birthday party, in which inside, he causes the most utter chaos he could cause. Soon afterwards, Andy trots over to a nearby seafood restaurant and has a go at mimicking  as old couple eating with a knife and fork. Trouble arises later on in the story as a manager of another restaurant rings the police after being hassled by "Andy the gorilla" which prompts Andy to take the gorilla suit off to prove that he's a person and not a gorilla, but to no avail. When Jen arrives, Andy tries to bribe her into telling the authorities that he's just wearing a gorilla suit, but fails, with Jen ultimately betraying Andy to the police and the zoo.

Nick-Knockers Anonymous 
Andy is left at home while his parents are at the Parent-Teacher Interviews at Andy's school. Instead of pulling pranks, he is cleaning up because he is sure his parents will be mad at his reports, so he is cleaning so they will forget about the bad reports. As he cleans a light bulb, he hears a knock on the door and opens it to sees no one there. As Andy keeps cleaning the house, he keeps hearing knocks on the door and keeps seeing nobody there which is starting to annoy him. Andy soon accuses his best friend, Danny Pickett, for the tricks and fills a clean bucket with a disgusting mix composed of cornflakes, Vegemite, jam, vinegar, etc. and plans to throw it all over Danny as revenge. Soon, when "Danny" is about to knock on the door again, Andy flips open the front door and throws the mix on what he hopes to be Danny, but soon makes a shocking discovery: he had accidentally thrown it all over his mother. As Andy's father prepares for "a little talk", Andy prays that they'll be "eating out of the palm of his hand" later in the night.

Tell Ya Mum I Saved Ya 
Andy is at a school camp with Roseanne O'Reilly, the most annoying girl he has ever met, who plays practical jokes on him that he finds dumb. After falling for one of her pranks, Andy decides to get her back. He gets Danny to fill her pack with rocks before they set off hiking. Not only does the joke backfire when Danny puts the rocks in the wrong pack (Andy's), but Andy ends up with a sprained ankle and has to rely on Roseanne's help to finish the hike.

Emergency Spew Relish 
Andy is flying on a thirty-six seater plane to Mildura by himself to visit his grandparents. Before take-off, he puts a piece of rubber dog dung on the seat next to him, for he likes to sit alone on the craft with his feet on the other seat. However, a blind old lady sits next to Andy anyway, after which he tries to get rid of her, not knowing that she's blind. To get the lady out of the seat next him, Andy grabs some of his special "emergency corn relish" and puts it into his mouth, pretending that he is going to be sick and spits out all the corn relish into an air sickness bag, next pretending to think that his "spew" tastes really good to disgust the lady, which quite oddly, she doesn't mind. Soon, after numerous attempts to drive the blind lady to another seat, Andy finally discovers the old lady is blind and tells her that he's going to be sick again.

Beat the Bomb! 
Andy enters a game on the fictional radio station, Triple B, called "Beat the Bomb", in which a listener is rung, a clock ticks (which gets faster over time) and an amount of money, which increases as the time goes on, is said to the listener. If the listener tells the DJ on the radio to stop, the amount of money is won, but if the clock is left ticking for too long, an explosion is heard over the phone and all the money is lost and, according to Andy, blasted all over the room.

Using special equipment to mimic the game, Andy and Danny decide to get a prank victim, Martin Bonwick, to play Beat the Bomb and he does, in which he wins $500 afterwards and soon confessing that he needed the money badly, due to the fact his family has been struggling since his father died a couple of years ago. Later in the story, the Triple B DJ rings Andy and Danny, worrying that Marvin might have called the station to see if the call was legit, but Andy and Danny are relieved when they are invited to play the real "Beat the Bomb" on the radio now, in which Andy wins $502 and gets to listen to John Farnham afterward despite hating his music. Soon, Andy has second thoughts about the prank he played on Martin and decides to give $500 to him like Andy promised, splitting the remaining $2 between himself and Danny.

Born to Die 
Andy buys a fake rub-on tattoo from a Target store to try to freak out his enemies—Steve Lik and Robert Leech—the first of which Andy used to hang around with on weekends until Robert came along. They are scared of the tattoo at first, but oddly, they then welcome Andy into Lik's house for a milkshake, in which Andy asks for a chocolate one. While his ex-enemies make the shake, Andy channel surfs, eventually settling on Play School. After watching more of the program, he finally receives his milkshake, after which Lik and Leech want to watch Andy drink, while showing them tattoos similar to Andy's. At the end of the story, Leech claims that they used slugs instead of chocolate syrup to make the milkshake.

Invisipills 
At his school's library, Danny is quietly annoying Andy about how he wants to be invisible. To stop Danny bragging and get him out of the library so he can work alone afterwards, Andy pulls out a tube of fictional round candy balls, which he claims are "invisipills", and can actually make people invisible, offering one to Danny. Once he is "invisible", unaware that he is actually not, Danny causes severe havoc around the library, during which Andy's lollies are confiscated by Mrs. Wharton, the school librarian, who later "ceases" Danny's antics by twisting his ear. Afterwards, the duo are thrown out of the library and sent to the principal's office, in which during the walk there, Danny, unfortunately, actually does turn invisible now, which possesses Andy to head straight to the sick bay.

A Terrible Christmas and a Crappy New Year 
Andy comes up with the idea of vandalising Jen's Christmas cards, ready to be sent to her friends for the holidays, and turn the jolly Santas on the front into ugly, mutant ones. To make Jen not notice, he volunteers to post the cards for her, but once they're all in, Andy reconsiders the joke, remembering that Santa only delivers presents to good girls and boys and thinks that making mutant Santas was a bad prank to play before Christmas. On Christmas Eve, Andy has a dream about a mutant Santa that gives him a rotten potato to eat as punishment for the cruel trick. Over the next few days, Andy fears that Jen will be friendless for the rest of her life, and decides to risk life and limb to confess, only to discover that all of Jen's friends loved the mutant Santas and that Jen is keeping the prank a secret.

Other Editions
American: Just Joking!British: Just Kidding!

External links 
 tricking andygriffiths.com.au

Short story collections by Andy Griffiths
Children's short story collections
1997 short story collections
1997 children's books
Macmillan Publishers books